La Mascara is an EP by The Blackeyed Susans released in November 1998. It peaked at No. 5 on the AIR Charts in November 1988 and No. 6 on the Australian Music Report's Alternative Singles/EP chart. Las Mascara was nominated for 'Best Single/EP (Independent)' at the 1999 Music Industry Critics Awards.

A video for "To Skin a Man" was produced and directed by Adam Kyle and Holly Shorland. The song featured in season one of the Australian television drama series, The Secret Life of Us.

Track listing 
 "To Skin a Man" (Kakulas, Snarski, Box) – 3:53
 "Oh Yeah, Oh Yeah, Oh No" (The Blackeyed Susans) – 3:01
 "Come Ride With Me" (Snarski, Blair, Luscombe) – 4:07
 "No Direction Home" (Snarski, Luscombe, Dawson) – 3:09
 "Be My Medicine" (Snarski, Kakulas) – 3:39

Personnel 
 Roberto Snarski – Vocals, acoustic guitar, electric guitar voz y guitarras acusticas y electricas
 Daniel Luscombe – Electric and acoustic guitar, choir
 Hernan Box – Keyboard and music sequencer
 Felipe Kakulas – Bass and Hammond organ
 Marcos Dawson – Drums and percussion
 Mateo Habben – Clarinet
 Adan Hutterer – Trombone

References

The Blackeyed Susans albums
1999 EPs
Albums produced by Victor Van Vugt